Chloroacetonitrile is the organic compound with the formula ClCH2CN.  A colorless liquid, it is derived from acetonitrile (CH3CN) by replacement of one H with Cl.  In practice, it is produced by dehydration of chloroacetamide.  The compound is an alkylating agent, and as such is handled cautiously.

Chloroacetonitrile is also generated in situ by the reaction of acetonitrile with sulfur monochloride.  A second chlorination gives dichloroacetonitrile, which undergoes cycloaddition with sulfur monochloride to give 4,5-dichloro-1,2,3-dithiazolium chloride:
Cl2CHCN  +  S2Cl2  →  [S2NC2Cl2]Cl  +  HCl

References

Nitriles